South Peterboro Street Commercial Historic District is a national historic district located at Canastota in Madison County, New York.  The district contains 20 contributing buildings, including the separately listed US Post Office-Canastota.  The buildings were built between about 1870 and 1930 and are largely two and three story attached brick rows set close to the street.

It was added to the National Register of Historic Places in 1986.

References

Historic districts on the National Register of Historic Places in New York (state)
Historic districts in Madison County, New York
National Register of Historic Places in Madison County, New York